Saotomea is a genus of sea snails, marine gastropod mollusks in the subfamily Fulgorariinae of the family Volutidae.

Species
Species within the genus Saotomea include:
 Subgenus Saotomea (Bondarevia) Bail & Chino, 2009
 Saotomea minima (Bondarev, 1994)
Subgenus Saotomea (Saotomea) Habe, 1943
 Saotomea delicata (Fulton, 1940)
 Saotomea hinae Bail & Chino, 2010
 Saotomea pratasensis Lan, 1997
 Saotomea solida Bail & Chino, 2000

References

 Bail, P & Poppe, G. T. 2001. A conchological iconography: a taxonomic introduction of the recent Volutidae. Hackenheim-Conchbook, 30 pp, 5 pl.
 Bail P. & Chino M. (2010) The family Volutidae. The endemic Far East Asian subfamily Fulgorariinae Pilsbry & Olsson, 1954: A revision of the Recent species. A conchological iconography (G.T. Poppe & K. Groh, eds). Hackenheim: Conchbooks.

Volutidae